is a retired Japanese professional catcher.

External links

Living people
1967 births
Baseball people from Osaka Prefecture
Japanese baseball players
Nippon Professional Baseball catchers
Nankai Hawks players
Hiroshima Toyo Carp players
Yomiuri Giants players
Japanese baseball coaches
Nippon Professional Baseball coaches
People from Yao, Osaka